Dragan Ristić (born 1978) is a Serbian male paralympic shooter competing in the rifle events. He won a gold  and silver  medal at the World Shooting Para Sport Championships in Sydney.

Early life
In 1999 he was involved in a traffic accident, which resulted in spinal cord injuries.

External links
Dragan Ristić Profile

References

Living people
1978 births
Place of birth missing (living people)
Wheelchair category Paralympic competitors
Paralympic shooters of Serbia
Shooters at the 2016 Summer Paralympics